Cavalier FC is a Bahamian football club based in the capital Nassau. It plays in the New Providence Football League.

Achievements
Bahamas National Championship Final winner: 4
1996/97, 1997/98, 1998/99, 2000/01

Bahamas FA Cup: 3
1982/83, 1999/00, 2000/01

Bahamas President's Cup: 3
1999, 2000, 2010/11

New Providence Football League: 5
1996/97, 1997/98, 1998/99, 1999/00, 2000/01

New Providence FA Cup: 3
1999/00, 2000/01, 2010/11

Football clubs in the Bahamas
Sport in Nassau, Bahamas